The 6th Airlift Squadron is part of the 305th Air Mobility Wing at the McGuire AFB section of Joint Base McGuire-Dix-Lakehurst, New Jersey.  It operates the Boeing C-17 Globemaster III supporting the United States Air Force global reach mission worldwide. The main base, along with the flying squadron, is located near the borough of Wrightstown, New Jersey.

Mission
Train and equip Boeing C-17 Globemaster III aircrews for global airland operations.

History

World War II
The squadron was constituted in a major Army reorganization of October 1933, but it was not activated until 1939, shortly after World War II had begun in Europe and the Air Corps began to expand. The squadron was allotted to the Fourth Corps Area and partly organized by July 1934 with reserve personnel at Shreveport, Louisiana and assigned to the 2d Transport Group, On 5 June 1936 it was allotted to the Fifth Corps Area and again organized with reserve personnel at Columbus, Ohio by August 1937.  All reserve personnel were withdrawn from the squadron in October 1939.

The squadron was activated on 14 October 1939, at Olmsted Field, Pennsylvania and assigned to the 10th Transport Group. Relieved from the 10th Transport Group on 1 December 1940 and assigned to the 60th Transport Group. Relieved from the 60th Transport Group on 19 May 1941 and assigned to the 61st Transport Group.

The squadron made airlift history during World War II when, in October 1942, it moved to Port Moresby, New Guinea. Then flying Douglas C-47 Skytrains, the 6th became the first personnel transport squadron to fly in the Pacific. It was during this assignment that the squadron earned the nickname Bully Beef Express, as it carried tons of boiled beef to allied combat troops in Australia and New Guinea. The French called it "bouilli boef', and the Americanization of the term has continued to this day to be the squadron's emblem.

The 6th performed aerial transportation in the Pacific Theater and Southwest Pacific Theater during World War II and in the Far East during the Korean War and after until 1968.

Strategic airlift
It has performed worldwide airlift operations since April 1970.  The 6th conducted resupply missions in support of scientific stations in the Antarctic during Operation Deep Freeze from 1971 to 1974.  It resupplied Israel during the 1973 Yom Kippur War. It evacuated Vietnamese refugees during the fall of Saigon in April through June 1975.  It has also supported U.S. forces in Grenada, October–December 1983, during the invasion of Panama, December 1989 – January 1990, and during the liberation of Kuwait, August 1990 – March 1991.

Lineage
 Constituted as the 6th Transport Squadron on 1 October 1933
 Organized with reserve personnel by July 1934 (remained inactive)
 Activated on 14 October 1939
 Redesignated 6th Troop Carrier Squadron on 4 July 1942
 Redesignated 6th Troop Carrier Squadron, Heavy on 21 May 1948
 Redesignated 6th Military Airlift Squadron on 8 January 1966
 Discontinued and inactivated on 8 June 1968
 Activated on 8 April 1970
 Redesignated 6th Airlift Squadron on 1 November 1991

Assignments

 2d Transport Group, 1 October 1933 (in inactive status)
 10th Transport Group, 14 October 1939
 60th Transport Group, 1 December 1940
 61st Transport Group, 19 May 1941
 315th Transport Group, March 1942
 63d Transport Group (later 63d Troop Carrier Group), June 1942
 374th Troop Carrier Group, 12 November 1942
 403d Troop Carrier Group, 15 May 1946
 374th Troop Carrier Group, 15 October 1946

 1503d Air Transport Wing, 18 November 1958
 1502d Air Transport Wing, 22 June 1964
 61st Military Airlift Wing, 8 January 1966 – 8 June 1968
 438th Military Airlift Wing, 8 April 1970
 438th Military Airlift Group, 1 October 1978
 438th Military Airlift Wing, 1 June 1980
 438th Operations Group, 1 November 1991
 305th Operations Group, 1 October 1994 – present

Stations

 Shreveport, Louisiana, by July 1934 – 5 June 1936 (in inactive status)
 Cleveland, Ohio, by August 1937 – 14 October 1939 (in inactive status)
 Olmsted Field, Pennsylvania, 14 October 1939
 Camp Williams, Wisconsin, 23 March 1942
 Dodd Field, Texas, 16–23 September 1942
 Port Moresby Airfield Complex, New Guinea, 13 October 1942
 Garbutt Field, Australia, 2 October 1943
 Nadzab Airfield Complex, New Guinea, c. 26 August 1944
 Mokmer Airfield, Biak, Pampa New Guinea, c. 20 October 1944
 Tacloban Airfield, Leyte, c. 12 March 1945

 Nielson Field, Luzon, 1 January 1946
 Okinawa, 10 June 1946
 Tachikawa Air Base, Japan, 13 April 1947
 Harmon Field, Guam, 1 December 1947
 Tachikawa Air Base, Japan, 5 March 1949
 Hickam Air Force Base, Hawaii, 22 June 1964 – 8 June 1968
 McGuire Air Force Base, New Jersey, 8 April 1970 – present

Aircraft

 Douglas C-33, 1940–1942
 Douglas C-39, 1940–1942
 Douglas C-53 Skytrooper, 1941–1942
 Douglas C-47 Skytrain, 1942–1945
 Curtiss C-46 Commando, 1945–1947

 Douglas C-54 Skymaster, 1946–1952
 Douglas C-124 Globemaster II, 1952–1968
 Lockheed C-141 Starlifter, 1970–2004
 Boeing C-17 Globemaster III, 2004–present

References

Notes
 Explanatory notes

 Citations

Bibliography

External links
Joint Base McGuire-Dix-Lakehurst (Official Web site)
 Air Mobility Command (Official Web site)

0006
Military units and formations in New Jersey